The Vancouver trolley bus system forms part of the TransLink public transport network serving Metro Vancouver in the Canadian province of British Columbia. In operation since 1948, the system presently comprises 13 routes and is managed by the Coast Mountain Bus Company, a subsidiary of TransLink. It uses a fleet of 262 trolley buses, of which 74 are articulated vehicles.

History
Following a formal opening ceremony on 13 August 1948, regular service on Vancouver's first trolley bus routes began on 16 August 1948, operated by the British Columbia Electric Railway (BCER). Two routes opened on that day, 6 Fraser and 15 Cambie, and routes 5 Robson and 8 Davie followed later the same year.  All of these first routes had been conversions of streetcar lines except for the Cambie route. Conversion of several more streetcar and motorbus routes quickly followed, and by 1953, the trolley bus system had 16 routes. Three more trolley bus lines were created in 1955, when the last streetcar line, Hastings, closed and was replaced by the 14 Hastings trolley bus route and two branches, routes 16 Renfrew and 24 Nanaimo. This brought the network to what was, for several years, its maximum extent, with 19 routes.

The service was provided by CCF-Brill trolley buses, with 82 of model T44 acquired in 1947 and 1948, and 245 of the larger model T48 (and variants T48A and T48SP) acquired between 1949 and 1954. With the delivery of the last new Brill trolley bus, in January 1954, Vancouver had the largest trolley bus fleet in Canada, 327 units.

The fleet later included 25 1947-built Pullman-Standard trolley buses acquired secondhand from Birmingham, Alabama, which entered service in March 1957. However, drivers considered the Pullmans awkward to operate, and the vehicles were found to be surplus to the company's needs; they were taken out of service in 1960 and scrapped in 1961. In the mid-1970s, the remaining T44-model trolley buses were retired, and in their place 50 new trolley buses were acquired from Flyer Industries. Flyer Model E800s were new vehicles except for the propulsion system, which used recycled General Electric equipment from the earlier Brill T-44s. The Flyer E800s were delivered in late 1975 and 1976. Their use of recycled 1940s electrical equipment resulted in a shorter lifespan, and they were withdrawn in 1985, but around 25 returned to service for Expo 86, and the last few were in occasional service until January 1987.

In the early 1980s, the system acquired 245 new Flyer E901A/E902 trolley buses. These began to enter service in mid-1982, gradually replacing the CCF-Brill vehicles. The last use of a Brill trolley bus in service occurred on 25 March 1984. After withdrawal of the last E800s, in early 1987, Flyer E901A/E902 vehicles made up the whole of the Vancouver trolley bus fleet for almost 20 years. E902 No. 2937 was irreparably damaged by an electrical fire in 1987, reducing the total number of trolley buses to 244.

Several extensions to the system were constructed and opened in 1986, in connection with the opening of the SkyTrain rapid transit system. An extension from Blanca Street to the University of British Columbia opened in September 1988.

From 2005 to 2009, the fleet was renewed again. New Flyer Industries in Winnipeg won the contract for the supply of the new vehicles, with electrical equipment by the German company Vossloh Kiepe. In December 2008, 80 of the old Flyer E901A/E902 buses were sold to the Mendoza trolleybus system in Argentina. Vancouver now has a fleet of 262 low-floor trolley buses, supplied under the New Flyer contract between 2005 and the end of 2009.

Services

Current routes
The 13 routes that make up the present Vancouver trolley bus system are:
 3 Downtown – Main / Marine Drive Station
 4 UBC – Downtown/Powell (runs UBC – Downtown only after 8 p.m.)
 5 Downtown – Robson
 6 Downtown – Davie
 7 Dunbar – Downtown – Nanaimo Station
 8 Downtown – Fraser
 10 Downtown – Granville
 14 UBC – Downtown/Hastings (runs UBC – Downtown only after 6:30 p.m.)
 16 Arbutus – Downtown / 29th Avenue Station
 17 Downtown – Oak
 19 Stanley Park – Metrotown Station (via Kingsway)
 20 Downtown – Victoria
 41 41st Avenue – Crown – Joyce Station

Awaiting reinstatement
 9 Alma – Boundary (via Broadway); scheduled to reopen upon completion of the Millennium Line Broadway extension

Former routes
 15 Cambie – Downtown (trolley service discontinued September 2005 for Canada Line construction)

Current fleet
Vancouver's current fleet of trolley buses, all built by New Flyer, is made up of the following types:

The original order for these trolley buses, placed in late 2003, was for 188 conventional and 40 articulated buses. The first, a model E40LF, was delivered in July 2005, and the rest of the 40-footers, now designated E40LFR, were delivered between August 2006 and September 2007.

The first articulated arrived in Vancouver in January 2007. TransLink decided to order an additional 34 articulated units, making the total 74, and delivery of the 73 production-series E60LFR units took place between October 2007 and autumn 2009.

Preservation
Three of Vancouver's trolley buses and one former trolley bus that was converted to diesel running have been preserved by the Transit Museum Society.  The operational ones see occasional use for special events and on enthusiast fan trips. Several Brill trolley buses are stored in the ghost town of Sandon awaiting restoration. The Sandon buses were acquired from the former fleets of Vancouver, Calgary, Saskatoon, and Regina.

See also

List of bus routes in Greater Vancouver
List of trolley bus systems in Canada

References

Books

External links

 Coast Mountain Bus Company
 TransLink / Greater Vancouver Transportation Authority
 
 

TransLink (British Columbia)
Bus transport in British Columbia
Vancouver
Vancouver
1948 establishments in British Columbia